Women Against Feminism is an informal movement of women sharing equal ideals with antifeminists in rejecting feminism. Using #WomenAgainstFeminism, the hashtag is normally accompanied by a "selfie" style photo, holding up handwritten posters stating reasons why they disapprove of modern feminism. Most of the posts begin with the statement, "I don't need feminism because", followed by their reason(s).

The supporters of this movement primarily use social media platforms such Twitter and Tumblr, while campaigning on sites such as Facebook, Instagram, and YouTube to advocate their views.

Origin and content
The Women Against Feminism campaign began on Tumblr in July 2013, presumably in response to the "Who Needs Feminism" campaign. According to the BBC, the movement is an online community that use social media to brand 'Feminism' as a 'toxic' movement. Following on the original creator of the Women Against Feminism Tumblr page is an American woman who has chosen to remain anonymous because of online harassment and backlash she has faced for her ideas.

A September 12, 2017 post to the Women Against Feminism blog titled "What is Feminism?" maps out the arguments of the blog's supporters. Community member and writer Jinna states "If Women Against Feminism were asked if they believe men and women should have equal human rights and equality before the law, the answer would be a resounding 'Yes'". The blog raises issue with the modern practice of feminism rather than the fundamental definition of feminism for the reason given that "3rd wave feminism is not feminism". It argues that as long as men and women are equal before the law, feminism is unnecessary, fosters misandry, and distracts from men's rights issues.

Response
The response by the media, social commentators, and feminists has included support and criticism. As of 19 August 2014, the campaign's Facebook page had garnered 21,000 likes.

Supporters say modern feminism has gone astray in some ways and cite examples such as radical feminists not supporting trans women and saying things such as, "anyone born a man retains male privilege in society, even if he chooses to live as a woman", and related complaints that some feminists exaggerate women's problems while ignoring men's problems. Also cited was the abortion debate and the argument that women have suffered as a result of a feminist culture that promotes casual sex as empowering.

Critics say the young women involved in this campaign do not appear to know what feminism is and are arguing against an imaginary foe using straw man arguments. A commentator from  writes: "Most of the posts include some reiteration of the central misunderstanding about feminism, that a core belief of feminism involves hating men." A commentator from  wrote, "being anti-feminism is like being pro-apartheid, or a big fan of social injustice, but no one would think it's cute to hold up a sign saying that.", while independent researcher Mackenzie Cockerill states that "[a] global culture of misogyny is growing and flourishing thanks to the internet and its unprecedented potential for connecting people and their ideas."

Commenting on the campaign, Anette Borchorst, professor and researcher in sex and gender in the Department of Political Science, Aalborg University, stated that "there have always been disagreements and debates within feminism and those debates help to advance the movement." She added that, "Feminism has always generated debate among women and it is difficult to imagine a feminist world-view that everyone can agree on."

Beulah Maud Devaney's September 2015 column on openDemocracy compares Women Against Feminism to the history of women's opposition to feminism dating back to the late 1700s, suggesting that a modern anti-feminist campaign will be just as ineffective in combating the feminist movement as preceding efforts. Devaney asserts that Women Against Feminism mainly represents the view of privileged women who want to maintain the status quo and are, thus, deliberately misrepresenting what feminism stands for.  According to Devaney, "As intersectional feminism becomes more popular it is, sadly, to be expected that some white, straight, cis first world women will see the emphasis on their own privilege as an attack. In a similar way feminist calls for a more inclusive beauty standard and appreciation of multiple body types can be read as an attempt to undermine the received wisdom that 'skinny white girl' is the ideal aesthetic." Devaney adds that Women Against Feminism has failed to stem public support for the feminist agenda, that its influence is minor, and that its arguments are "easy to dismiss."  Devaney concludes, however, that the anti-feminism it represents deserves closer examination.

In October 2015, Angela Epstein mentioned the blog in an editorial criticizing feminists for being unpleasant to women who disagree with them. Epstein argues that feminists have lost their cause and are fighting unnecessary battles and overplaying issues such as women's "self-imposed glass ceiling". Recounting her experience of receiving insulting messages after sharing her stance on modern feminism with BBC News, she states, "I don't expect all women to agree with me. But there are many who do. Look no further than the proliferation of websites such as Women Against Feminism."

Recent works such as Oana Crusmac's The Social Representation of Feminism within the movement "Women Against Feminism" argues that social representation of feminism within WAF is not based on lack of information, but rather on a stereotypical understanding of the concept. Crusmac's work also argues that "WAF contributes do not quality as post feminists" as "While post-feminists can be easily identified and characterised by the already famous expression "I am not a feminist, but...", WAF contributes categorically reject any feminist resemblance and instead prefer either to be labelled as "humanist" or "egalitarian", either to be strong supporters of the traditional gender roles.' Cursmac's research also reveals that social representation of feminism in the on-line group WAF has "numerous common elements with the way the second wave was stereotyped by the 80s media backlash against feminism, such as: feminism is an ideology that demonises men and does not wish equality (which is a goal already accomplished), but special treatment and privileges for women, thereby ignoring the individual contribution in shaping success or decision making. Moreover, in the same direction in common with the negative illustration of the 80s, feminism is seen as a threat to family and womanhood, and as a promoter of promiscuity."

See also
 Hashtag activism
 NotAllMen
 Men's rights movement

References

External links
 Women Against Feminism on Tumblr
 Postings to #WomenAgainstFeminism on Twitter
 Who Needs Feminism? on Tumblr
 Confused Cats Against Feminism on Tumblr

Feminism in the United States
Hashtags
Social media campaigns
Men's rights
Female critics of feminism
Criticism of feminism